Chinese singer and actor Zhou Mi has released two extended plays and four singles.

Extended plays

Singles

Appearances

Compilation appearances

Other appearances

Songwriting and composing credits 
All credits below are sourced from Korea Music Copyright Association (search ID '10007155') and Music Copyright Society of China (search '周觅').

Music videos

Notes

References

Discographies of Chinese artists
Mandopop discographies